Auguste Jacques Nicolas Peureux de Mélay was Governor General for Inde française in the Second French Colonial Empire.

In 1818, he captained a flotilla leaving Saint Louis, Senegal for the upper Senegal river. He founded the fort of Bakel when the low water level forced them to stop 900 km upriver.

Titles Held

References

French colonial governors and administrators
Governors of French India
People of the July Monarchy
1777 births
1835 deaths